The 1991 Campeonato Ecuatoriano de Fútbol de la Serie A was the 33rd season of the Serie A, the top level of professional football in Ecuador.

Teams
The number of teams for this season was played by 12 teams.

(In First Stage) 

(In Second Stage)

First stage

Second stage

Group A
Group B

Third stage

Group A

Group B

Relegation Liguilla

Cuadrangular Final
</onlyinclude>

Second-place playoffs

References

External links
 Línea de Tiempo de eventos y partidos de Liga Deportiva Universitaria
 Calendario de partidos históricos de Liga Deportiva Universitaria
 Sistema de Consulta Interactiva y Herramienta de consulta interactiva de partidos de Liga Deportiva Universitaria
1991 season on RSSSF

1991
Ecu
 Football